Preet Brar is a Punjabi musician. He incorporates many humorous elements into most of his songs. He is originally from Ganganagar, Rajasthan, India.

Discography

Religious

Duo Collaboration

Compilation

Singles

External links
   Preet Bear on Facebook

References

Indian male singers
Living people
Year of birth missing (living people)